Sanda is a town in Lahore District near the bank of river Ravi and Islampura (formerly Kirshan Nagar).

It is divided into Sanda Kalan and Sanda Khurd. The local government complex is situated in Sanda near the former Firdous cinema. Rajgarh, National town, Sunat Nagar, Hashmi Street and Sham Nagar are all located in the vicinity of Sanda. In Sanda there exists a LDA scheme called Sanda homes. The main Sanda road starts from MAO College link lower Mall with Bund road. It was founded on lands of sandha darogha family of Lahore by their ancestors.According to British revenue department documents of 1868 Sanda Family paid thousands rupees tax.Sandha Darogha Family's Head Mian Omer-uddin (s/o of lahore's landlord mian sadarudin)was sub divisional officer and Lahore fort incharge .Mian Omerdin was great grandson of mian naseerudin who founded sanda kalan in 17th century.Mian Omerudin's son Abdurrahim Darogha was also the landlord/owner of mozia umerabad village tehsil pattoki and he owned thousands acres in Sanda kalan and tehsil pattoki.The Sanda family was one of the most enlightened and educated people of the nineteenth century and the Sanda family was well known in the Muslim society of Lahore.In twentieth century mian naseerudin (ii) was elected as Mayor of Lahore and member of legislative assembly.This Family is also currently well known in noble arain families and tehsil pattoki and Lahore.

Data Gunj Bakhsh Zone